"For Want of a Nail" is a proverb, having numerous variations over several centuries, reminding that seemingly unimportant acts or omissions can have grave and unforeseen consequences.

Analysis 

The proverb has come down in many variations over the centuries. It describes a situation where there is a failure to predict or correct a minor issue; the minor issue escalates and compounds itself into a major issue. The rhyme's implied small difference in initial conditions is the lack of a spare horseshoe nail, relative to a condition of its availability. At a more literal level, it expresses the importance of military logistics in warfare.

Related sayings are "A stitch, in time, saves nine" and "An ounce of prevention is worth a pound of cure". A somewhat similar idea is referred to in the metaphor known as the camel's nose.

Historical references 

 

The proverb is found in a number of forms, beginning as early as the 13th century:
 
Middle High German (positively formulated): Diz ſagent uns die wîſen, ein nagel behalt ein îſen, ein îſen ein ros, ein ros ein man, ein man ein burc, der ſtrîten kan. ("The wise tell us that a nail keeps a shoe, a shoe a horse, a horse a man, a man a castle, that can fight.") (c. 1230 Freidank Bescheidenheit)
"For sparinge of a litel cost, Fulofte time a man hath lost, The large cote for the hod." ("For sparing a little cost often a man has lost the large coat for the hood.") (c 1390 John Gower, Confessio Amantis v. 4785–4787)
 Middle French: "Par ung seul clou perd on ung bon cheval." (Modern French: "Par seulement un clou, on perd un bon cheval."; English: "By just one nail one loses a good horse.") (c 1507 Jean Molinet, Faictz Dictz D., v768).
"The French-men haue a military prouerbe; 'The losse of a nayle, the losse of an army'. The want of a nayle looseth the shooe, the losse of shooe troubles the horse, the horse indangereth the rider, the rider breaking his ranke molests the company, so farre as to hazard the whole Army". (1629 Thomas Adams (clergyman), "The Works of Thomas Adams: The Sum Of His Sermons, Meditations, And Other Divine And Moral Discourses", p. 714")
"For want of a naile the shoe is lost, for want of a shoe the horse is lost, for want of a horse the rider is lost." (1640 George Herbert Outlandish Proverbs no. 499)
Benjamin Franklin included a version of the rhyme in his Poor Richard's Almanack. (Benjamin Franklin, Poor Richards Almanack, June 1758, The Complete Poor Richard Almanacks, facsimile ed., vol. 2, pp. 375, 377)
In British Columbia Saw-Mill Co. v. Nettleship (1868), L.R. 3 C.P. 499 (Eng. Q.B.), a variation on the story is given a legal flavor:
"Cases of this kind have always been found to be very difficult to deal with, beginning with a case said to have been decided about two centuries and a half ago, where a man going to be married to an heiress, his horse having cast a shoe on the journey, employed a blacksmith to replace it, who did the work so unskilfully that the horse was lamed, and, the rider not arriving in time, the lady married another; and the blacksmith was held liable for the loss of the marriage. The question is a very serious one; and we should inevitably fall into a similar absurdity unless we applied the rules of common sense to restrict the extent of liability for the breach of contract of this sort."
"Don't care" was the man who was to blame for the well-known catastrophe: "For want of a nail the shoe was lost, for want of a shoe the horse was lost, and for want of a horse the man was lost." (1880 Samuel Smiles, Duty)
A short variation of the proverb (shown to the right) was published in 1912 in Fifty Famous People by James Baldwin. The story associated with the proverb describes the unhorsing of King Richard III during the Battle of Bosworth Field, which took place on 22 August 1485.  However, historically Richard's horse was merely mired in the mud. In Baldwin's story, the proverb and its reference to losing a horse is directly linked to King Richard famously shouting "A Horse! A Horse! My Kingdom for a Horse!", as depicted in Act V, Scene 4 from the Shakespeare play Richard III.
"You bring your long-tailed shovel, an' I'll bring me navvy [labourer; in this context referring to a navvy shovel (square mouth shovel)]. We mighten' want them, an', then agen, we might: for want of a nail the shoe was lost, for want of a shoe the horse was lost, an' for want of a horse the man was lost—aw, that's a darlin' proverb, a daarlin'".(1925 S. O'casey Juno and the Paycock i. 16)
During World War II, this verse was framed and hung on the wall of the Anglo-American Supply Headquarters in London, England.

Modern references 

Along with the long history of the proverb listed above, it has continued to be referenced in some form or another since the mid 20th century in modern culture. The examples below show how the proverb has had profound implications into a variety of issues and commentary in modern culture.

Legal 

In his dissent in Massachusetts v. Environmental Protection Agency (549 US 497, 2007), Chief Justice John G. Roberts of the U.S. Supreme Court cites "all for the want of a horseshoe nail" as an example of a possible chain of causation.  He claimed that, by contrast, the threshold jurisdictional issue of standing requires a likely chain of causation, which was not satisfied by the U.S. Environmental Protection Agency's regulation of new automobile emissions to prevent the loss of Massachusetts coastal land due to climate change.
 In his dissent in CSX Transportation, Inc. v. McBride, Roberts again invokes the proverb, explaining that, in tort law, the doctrine of proximate cause is meant to "limit[] liability at some point before the want of a nail leads to loss of the kingdom."

Literary 

Cannibals And Missionaries, by Mary McCarthy, quotes on page 199: "No detail... was too small to be passed over.... 'For want of a nail,' as the proverb said."
In the novel Rage, by Stephen King, using the pseudonym Richard Bachman, the main character Charlie Decker references the proverb: "But you can't go back. For want of a shoe the horse was lost, and all that." King's 1987 novel The Tommyknockers also references the proverb in its first line: "For want of a nail the kingdom was lost – that's how the catechism goes when you boil it down."
JLA: The Nail is a three-issue comic book limited series published by DC Comics in 1998 about a world where the baby Kal-El was never found by Ma and Pa Kent because a nail punctured their truck tire on the day when they would have found his ship and so the child does not grow up to become Superman. The story uses the English ("Knight") variation of the rhyme as a theme.
A Wind in the Door is a fantasy/science fiction novel by Madeleine L'Engle which was a sequel to A Wrinkle in Time. The proverb is used in the novel as an explanation by Meg Murry to help Mr. Jenkins understand how a microscopic creature can affect the fate of the universe and is the impetus for much of the action.
"For Want of a Nail", a 2011 Hugo award-winning short story by Mary Robinette Kowal, explores the choices that an artificial intelligence and her wrangler must make to solve a seemingly-simple technical problem.
The poem "Kiss", found in the collection Full Volume, by Robert Crawford (Scottish poet), is based on the proverb.
The poem "Tale of a Nail", by the Polish poet Zbigniew Herbert, starts with the line "For lack of a nail the kingdom fell".
The children's poem "The Nail and the Horseshoe (Гвоздь и Подкова)", by the Russian writer Samuil Marshak, retells the proverb in a slight variation where the enemy captured a city because a blacksmith shop did not have a nail in stock. The flow of the poem is very similar to that of its English equivalent.
William Golding quotes the whole poem at the end of chapter 9 of his novel The Spire. There, the nail referred to is one of the Nails of the Holy Cross. That relic, when it is embedded at the base of the cross which had to be erected on top of the spire under construction next to Salisbury Cathedral, was thought to ensure stability to all of the daring building and to defeat the evil forces that rage against it, which are symbolized by the howling wind.
The proverb is told to Katy Carr by her father in the novel What Katy Did, by Susan Coolidge. Katy is angry about getting into trouble after being late to school because she had not bothered to sew a string onto her bonnet.
In his short story "Anxiety Is the Dizziness of Freedom" in Exhalation: Stories, Ted Chiang cites the proverb. The story is set in a world in which people can see alternate timelines through the use of prisms.
It is given in the book The Fallacy Detective as a potential example of a slippery-slope logical fallacy.
In writer Michael Flynn's 1990 Science Fiction novel, IN THE COUNTRY OF THE BLIND, the proverb is mentioned when discussing an unusual list of names & historical events found when remodeling an old building. In response the term "horseshoe nails" is coined to refer to historical events or actions with disproportionately large impacts. The Horeshoe Nail concept is a key part of the novel's plot and is mentioned several times.

Musical 

 Todd Rundgren's song "The Want of a Nail" from his album Nearly Human uses the rhyme as a metaphor for someone who has lived their entire life without love, and how, if you "multiply it a billion times" and "spread it all over the world," things fall apart. A cover of Rundgren's version is also used in the 2003 film Camp as the cast is introduced at the end of the film.
 Aesop Rock's song "No City" from his album None Shall Pass samples a voice reading the proverb, setting the tone for the idiosyncratic rap.
 Tom Waits's song "Misery Is the River of the World" from his album Blood Money includes the line "for want of a nail, a shoe was lost" as well as several other variations on the theme.
 The proverb was set to music on Bing Crosby's 1958 children's album, Jack B. Nimble.
Israeli songwriter Naomi Shemer wrote a translated version of the song called "HaKol Biglal Masmer" (All Because of a Nail).
 Newsboys song "It's All Who You Know" from the album Take Me to Your Leader is based on variations of the theme
 The Mountain Goats' song "Incandescent Ruins" from Bleed Out (album) references the proverb in the lines "There's a lot of things that can happen / All for the want of the nail."

Cinema and television 

 The title of the season two episode of M*A*S*H, "For Want of a Boot", is adapted from the proverb. The episode's concept itself is also based on the proverb, with the character of Hawkeye going through a convoluted process involving several camp personnel, in order to get a new boot.
 In the movie The Fast and the Furious: Tokyo Drift, the proverb was used by Kamata (Sonny Chiba) to explain to his nephew the result of a small detail being overlooked.
 In the movie Father Goose, Frank Houghton (Trevor Howard) in his first scene of the movie, while talking to an Admiral on the telephone, uses part of the proverb by saying "For want of a nail, the war was..." in reference to finding an additional coastal plane spotter.
 In the episode of USA's Monk, "Mr. Monk at Your Service", Monk quotes the proverb after being challenged by an employee that suggest a fork being a centimeter off center wasn't a problem. Monk: "For the want of a nail, the kingdom was lost."
 In the 1982 movie The Verdict, Ed Concannon (James Mason) uses the proverb, "for want of a shoe the horse was lost" to his disciples to describe what the case has become after Frank Galvin turned down the settlement.
 The entire proverbial rhyme is recited by the character Abraham Farlan in the 1946 motion picture A Matter of Life and Death. Here it was used to describe the chain of circumstances which formed the life of the main character, Peter Carter.
 In season two, episode three of the television show Sliders, while trying to repair the timer device in a world crippled by 'anti-technology' Professor Arturo exclaims, "For want of a shoe the war was lost."
 In the 50th episode of Dead or Alive, Man On Horseback, Josh Randall, Steve McQueen's character, uses the proverb "For the want of a nail, they lost the shoe. For the want of a shoe, they lost the horse. For the want of a horse, they lost the rider" to justify the reason why he is taking with him four extra horseshoes.
 In the Dad's Army episode 'No Spring for Frazer', Captain Mainwaring chastises Private Frazer for losing a part of his gun by reciting a condensed version: "For want of a nail, a shoe was lost. For want of a shoe, a horse was lost. For want of a horse, the battle was lost."
 In the 1967 Mannix episode "Turn Every Stone", Joe Mannix alludes to the saying at the end when he says, "It's the old horseshoe-nail bit again. For want of $10,000, a million was lost."
 In the 1954 movie The Caine Mutiny, Captain Queeg (Bogart) refers to the proverb during the following conversation with Ensign Keith after he reprimanded him for failing to enforce the untucked shirt-tails rule. "I know a man's shirt's a petty detail, but big things are made up of details. Don't forget, 'For want of a nail, a horseshoe was lost and then the whole battle.' A captain's job is a lonely one. He's easily misunderstood. Forget that I bawled you out."
 In June 2021, on his show Tenebrozo, Mexican clown-politic analyst “Brozo”, used the proverb to describe the political climate in Mexico, regarding a fatal metro accident in Mexico City: “For want of a bolt, a concret tablet was lost, for the want of a tablet, a lock is gone, for the want of a lock, a convoy is gone, for the want of a convoy, a candidate for president is gone”.

Video games 

 In the 1996 computer game Star Trek: Borg "Q" quips the line "For want of a horseshoe nail" to the player during a dialog sequence.
 The 2016 video game Tom Clancy's The Division contains a reference to the proverb in one of antagonist Aaron Keener's audio logs.

See also 

Alliteration
Broken windows theory
Butterfly effect
Camel's nose
Cascading failure
Causality
Chaos theory
Domino effect
Folklore
Parallelism
Proverb
Remoteness in English law
Rhyme
Slippery slope

Bibliography 

 Benjamin Franklin, Poor Richards Almanack, June 1758, The Complete Poor Richards Almanacks, facsimile ed., vol. 2, pp. 375, 377
 G. Herbert, Outlandish Proverbs, c. 1640, no. 499
 Oxford Dictionary of Nursery Rhymes, ed. Iona and Peter Opie, Oxford 1951, pg 324

References

External links 

 Famous Quotes UK (Retrieved 14-Feb-2008)
 "For want of a nail" at Everything2.com (Retrieved 14-Feb-2008)
 The Lorenz Butterfly (Retrieved 14-Feb-2008)
 JSTOR:For Want of a Nail, E. J. Lowe, Analysis, Vol. 40, No. 1 (Jan., 1980), pp. 50–52 (Retrieved 14-Feb-2008)
 James S. Robbins on 9/11 Commission published 9 April 2004 by National Review Online "For want of a nail:Lady Condoleezza on the battle of the Saracens." (Retrieved 14-Feb-2008)
 Benjamin Franklin (1706–1790), U.S. statesman, writer. Poor Richard’s Almanac, preface (1758). (Retrieved 14-Feb-2008)

Poems
Oral tradition
Cultural anthropology
Chaos theory
Causality
Proverbs